The Reverend Frederick Asbury (F.A.) Cullen (c. 1868 – May 25, 1946) was an Methodist minister, community and civil rights activist based in Harlem, New York City. He supported legal and social protests, and was influential in working with the youth of his community.

His parents were Isaac and Emmeline Williams Cullen. They had both been slaves.

It is said that his religious awakening occurred at Baltimore's Sharp Street Methodist Episcopal Church, in September 1894. He was ordained as a Methodist minister in 1900 in Delaware County, Maryland.(The Methodist Episcopal Church was the forerunner of the Methodist Church (1939) and the United Methodist Church (1968).) He successfully led a two church circuit in Catlin, Maryland from 1900 to 1902. Later, he was assigned to St. Mark's Church, a congregation of mostly Black parishioners in New York's East Village. The church had a storefront mission in Harlem, Salem Chapel. He reached out to children as a means of getting their parents involved in the church. His success in recruiting led to the mission being elevated to an independent entity in 1908, becoming the Salem Methodist Episcopal Church. He led this church for 40 years.

He served as President of the Harlem branch of the NAACP. Notably, he served as Vice President for the historic 1917 Negro Silent Protest Parade.

Sometime before 1919, he married Carolyn Belle Mitchell (d. 1932), a soprano and pianist from Baltimore. They worked together in the Church. They had one unofficially adopted child, Countee LeRoy Porter, who assumed the Reverend's last name. Countee Cullen was a poet, and is regarded as a notable member of the Harlem Renaissance.

References 

1868 births
1946 deaths
African-American history in New York City
African-American history between emancipation and the civil rights movement
American human rights activists
American humanitarians
Clergy from New York City
NAACP activists